Ateliers de construction de La Meuse are a manufacturing and engineering company based in Liège in Belgium. During the period from 1888 to 1958, La Meuse built 1350 steam locomotives some for Belgian State Railways (later NMBS/SNCB), and many more for industrial networks. Of these a substantial number survive worldwide.

The company still exists today, focusing on boilermaking, mechanics and the assembly of large-scale machinery. They have facilities in Sclessin and Seraing.

History
The origins of the business date back to the 16th century. During 1835 Charles Marcellis, forge master, moved his business to La Boverie, Liège. The company was set up as Société Anonyme des Ateliers de la Meuse. In 1872, the name was changed to Société Anonyme des Ateliers de construction de La Meuse. These new workshops were erected on the site they currently occupy between the Meuse river and the Paris-Namur-Liége-Cologne rail line. Expansion followed so that they occupied an area of about ten hectares. The company produced heavy industrial equipment for mining and metallurgy. The first locomotives were built in 1887 for the SNCV, and La Meuse would be the last company to deliver a steam locomotive to NMBS/SNCB.

In 1889, there was produced a narrow gauge locomotive for an industrial user. They went on to eventually build over 800 locomotives for industrial users. Their customers were mostly Belgium, but also  Italy, Yugoslavia, Morocco, Congo, Romania, Turkey, Spain, Latin America and the Netherlands.

Locomotives

Belgian State Railways
 Type 8
 Type 9
 Type 10
 Type 11
 Type 12
 Type 23
 Type 25
 Type 29
 Type 32/32S
 Type 36
 Type 51

Deutsche Reichsbahn
 DRB Class 50

Hellenic State Railways
 SEK class Κγ

Surviving Steam Locomotives

References

External Links
 Company website
 Rail.lu 

Companies based in Liège Province
Engineering companies of Belgium
Locomotive manufacturers of Belgium